Ziegner is a German surname. Notable people with the surname include:

Hermann Ziegner (1864–1898), United States Army soldier and Medal of Honor recipient
Torsten Ziegner (born 1977), German footballer and manager

See also
Ziegler
Ziener

German-language surnames